François Connan (1508 – 1551, Paris) was a French jurist who took part in the humanist development of an historical jurisprudence.  He was a student of Andrea Alciato at the University of Bourges where he was a fellow student and friend of John Calvin. He later and became one of the university's most distinguished epigone. His most celebrated work is the Commentaria iuris civilis (Paris, 1538) an analysis of Roman law and legal theory.

Works 

Commentaria iuris civilis, Paris, 1538.

References

French legal scholars
French Renaissance humanists
Writers from Paris
1508 births
1551 deaths
French male non-fiction writers
16th-century French lawyers